The Serie B of the Brazilian Championship 2015 is a football competition held in Brazil, equivalent to the second division. It is contested by 20 clubs, between May 9 and November 28. The top four teams will have access to Série A in 2016 and the last four will be relegated to Série C in 2016. recently promoted Mogi Mirim was the first team to have its relegation confirmed, after losing to Ceará in October 31.After a defeat to Luverdense in November 6, Boa Esporte also was relegated. ABC also was relegated, after a tie against Bahia in November 10. Botafogo was promoted that same day, after a victory against Luverdense. In November 14, Vitória, Santa Cruz and América-MG confirmed their promotions. Ceará, that had spent most of the championship in the relegation zone, managed to escape relegation after a victory against Macaé in the last round, with this result, combined with Oeste's draw against Paysandu, relegating the Fluminense team.

Teams

Number of teams by state

Personnel and kits

League table 

Campeonato Brasileiro Série B seasons
2
Brazi